The Matra M530 is a sports car created and built by the French engineering group Matra.

Development

In 1965 Matra's CEO Jean-Luc Lagardère decided to develop a successor to the Matra Djet that was more appealing to the non-racing public - a voiture des copains (car for chums). The result was the Matra M530, the first "true" Matra sports car, the Djet having been a René Bonnet design. The car was named after Matra's R.530 missile, and was designed by former Simca designer Philippe Guédon.

Like its predecessor, the M530 was built on a steel frame with polyester body and a mid-engine layout. To accommodate 2+2 seating, a mid-mounted engine and a reasonable boot, various engine options were considered. In the end, the running gear came from Ford in Germany, akin to the Ford Mustang I prototype the "high compression" 1699 cc Ford Taunus V4 engine and gearbox from the Taunus 15M TS were chosen and mounted in a transaxle layout. This combination was compact enough to fit between the rear seats and the boot.

Other noteworthy features of the M530 were its targa top roof, pop-up headlights and, most notably, the outstanding avant-garde design.

M530/M530 A

The first M530 (badged Matra Sports M530) was shown to the public on March 7, 1967 at the Geneva Motor Show. It entered production a month later, incorporating modifications that included the addition of a chrome bumper bar to provide much-needed protection from parking shunts for the front grill, a modest reshaping of the dashboard to give the passenger a little more knee room, and the repositioning of the ignition key to facilitate access. In its first two production years, the chassis was built by Carrier in Alençon and assembly was undertaken by French coachbuilder Brissonneau et Lotz at Creil. The engine bay of the early model M530 was accessible by removing the acrylic glass rear window.

French artist Sonia Delaunay painted an M530 at the special request of Matra's CEO Jean-Luc Lagardère in 1968. That same year Carrozzeria Alfredo Vignale presented a custom bodied M530 coupé at the Geneva show. The car appeared again in Turin with some modifications and a new paint scheme.

1969 brought many changes to the M530. Firstly, the running gear followed the same evolution as the Ford model it was taken from and power increased to 75 DIN hp by using a different carburetor. Secondly, Matra closed a deal with Chrysler Europe, to sell their cars through the Simca dealer network from 1970 onwards and jointly develop the M530's successor. Finally, the cars were now constructed completely at the Matra Automobiles factory in Romorantin and badged M530 A.

The British magazine "Autocar" tested a Matra M530 A in March 1969. This put it significantly behind the similarly priced Lotus Elan +2 on performance, but the two cars were closely matched on fuel economy. The Ford-powered Matra's £2,160 manufacturer's recommended price was a little lower than the £2,244 price on the Lotus, but both were massively undercut by the £1,217 then being asked for the MG MGB GT which, although based on an older simpler design, sold in greater numbers. Also included in the price comparison was the Porsche 912 then being offered in the UK with a manufacturer's recommended retail price of £2,894. The testers commended the Matra's refinement, handling and steering, soundness of construction and finish, while noting that its performance was 'not outstanding'.

M530 LX
Introduced at the 1970 Geneva Motor Show was the Matra Sports M530 LX, which was a minor redesign of the M530 A by Michelotti. The most notable changes were the rear hatch (now made of glass and held open with struts like a hatchback) and the front bumper.

M530 SX
A budget version of the M530, the Matra Sports M530 SX, was introduced in October 1971 with a price below the psychological barrier of 20,000 francs. The SX lacks the targa top roof, and instead of pop-up headlights there were four fixed headlights mounted on top of the front. The only available colours were yellow and white, and the SX featured black bumpers instead of the LX's chrome bumpers.

Production numbers
Production of the M530 ceased in 1973 after a total of 9,609 cars (2,062 M530, 1,669 M530 A, 4,731 M530 LX and 1,146 M530 SX) were built.

No right-hand drive M530s were built.

Technical specifications

References

1970s cars
Cars introduced in 1967
Matra vehicles
Sports cars
Mid-engined cars
Rear mid-engine, rear-wheel-drive vehicles